Leandro Marchetti (born 20 December 1974) is an Argentine fencer. He competed in the individual foil events at the 1996 and 2000 Summer Olympics.

References

External links
 

1974 births
Living people
Argentine male fencers
Argentine foil fencers
Olympic fencers of Argentina
Fencers at the 1996 Summer Olympics
Fencers at the 2000 Summer Olympics
Pan American Games medalists in fencing
Pan American Games bronze medalists for Argentina
Fencers at the 1995 Pan American Games
20th-century Argentine people
Medalists at the 1995 Pan American Games